Beatriz Martínez (born 6 March 1986) is a Spanish sport shooter.

She participated at the 2018 ISSF World Shooting Championships, winning a medal.

References

External links

Living people
1986 births
Spanish female sport shooters
Trap and double trap shooters
Sportspeople from Oviedo
European Games competitors for Spain
Shooters at the 2019 European Games
20th-century Spanish women
21st-century Spanish women